Tazumuddin is an upazila of Bhola District in the Division of Barisal, Bangladesh.

Geography
It has a total area of 512.92 km2. It is bounded by Daulatkhan upazila on the north, Lalmohan, Manpura upazilas and Meghna river on the south, Hatiya and Ramgati upazilas and Meghna river on the east, Burhanuddin upazila on the west.

Demographics
Par the 2001 Bangladesh census, Tazumuddin had a population of 120189; males constituted 63576, females 56613; Muslim 109063, Hindu 11086, Buddhist 11, Christian 20 and others 9.

According to the 1991 Bangladesh census, the upazila had a population of 116,822, living in 20,444 households. Males constituted 51.94% of the population, and females 48.06%. The population aged 18 or over was 51,881. Tazumuddin had an average literacy rate of 27% (ages seven years and up), against the national average of 32.4%.

Administration
Tazumuddin Thana was formed on 28 August 1928 and it was turned into an upazila on 14 March 1983.

The Upazila is divided into five union parishads: Baro Molongchora, Chanchra, Chadpur, Shambupur, and Sonapur. The union parishads are subdivided into 36 mauzas and 75 villages.

See also
Upazilas of Bangladesh
Districts of Bangladesh
Divisions of Bangladesh

References

Upazilas of Bhola District